Kelch-like protein 20 is a protein that in humans is encoded by the KLHL20 gene.

The protein encoded by this gene is a member of the kelch family of proteins, which is characterized by a 44-56 amino acid repeat motif. The kelch motif appears in many different polypeptide contexts and contains multiple potential protein-protein contact sites. Members of this family are present both throughout the cell and extracellularly, with diverse activities.

References

Further reading

Kelch proteins